opened in Nara, Japan, in 1994. It was established thanks to donations of artworks and the support of Kintetsu.

See also
 Nara National Museum
 Yamato Bunkakan
 Nakano Museum of Art
 Nihonga

References

External links
  Shōhaku Art Museum

Museums in Nara, Nara
Art museums and galleries in Japan
Museums established in 1994
1994 establishments in Japan